Opportunity Knocks may refer to:

Opportunity Knocks (Canadian radio show), a 1947-1957 radio talent show
Opportunity Knocks (UK TV series), a 1949-1990 UK television and radio talent show
Opportunity Knocks (Australian TV series), a 1976-1978 Australian game show
Opportunity Knocks (film), a 1990 comedy film
Opportunity Knocks (2002 TV show), a 2002 US TV show hosted by Dave Coulier and Shaune Bagwell
Opportunity Knocks (game show), a 2008 US television game show
"Opportunity Knocks" (My Boys), a 2008 episode of the American sitcom My Boys